State Highway 59, abbreviated SH-59, is a  state highway in central Oklahoma. It runs from Criner, Oklahoma in McClain Co. to Wewoka.

Route description
SH-59 begins at SH-39 north of Criner and immediately heads due south through that town. It turns due east six miles (9.6 km) north of Lindsay, serving Payne instead. After a  concurrency with SH-24, SH-59 crosses SH-74 and has an interchange with I-35.

Shortly after passing under the interstate, it meets US-77 south of Wayne, and passes through the small towns of Rosedale and Byars. Five miles (8 km) east of Byars, it meets U.S. Highway 177 and turns northward to join with it. SH-3W joins the concurrency five miles later.

The three highways cross over the South Canadian River to enter Pottawatomie Co. just south of Asher. In Asher, SH-59 meets SH-39 a second time, and six miles (10 km) later it splits off from US-177 and SH-3W to head east again, through St. Louis, Oklahoma and Maud. It forms a concurrency with US-377/SH-99/SH-3E south of Seminole, before splitting off near Bowlegs. It meets US-270 west of Wewoka, and then ends two miles (3 km) later.

History
SH-59 was first added to the state highway system in 1932 and was entirely contained within McClain County, running from Wayne to State Highway 18 (present-day US-177). It was extended eastward to end at SH-48 (present-day US-377/SH-99) north of Bowlegs in 1947 or 1948. It was extended to its present eastern terminus in 1965 or 1966, and no significant changes have been made since.

Spurs

SH-59A

SH-59A runs from US-177/SH-59 east to connect with SH-3W south of SH-59's own connection with the highway. This allows eastbound travelers to more easily access Ada.

SH-59B

SH-59B runs from SH-59 south to connect with SH-19 just east of Lindsay.

SH-59B

(Neither Mapquest nor Google Maps show these endpoints; they instead indicate 59B runs from the vicinity of the Pottawatomie/Cleveland County line, well west of SH-102, east past that road to US-177. Google additionally shows 59B running past US-177 a short additional distance east to Oklahoma State Highway 18.) The highway's entire length lies in Pottawatomie County. SH-59B does not directly connect to SH-59.

Junction list

References

External links
SH-59 at OKHighways

059
Transportation in McClain County, Oklahoma
Transportation in Pottawatomie County, Oklahoma
Transportation in Seminole County, Oklahoma